Dun Law is a hill in the Lowther Hills range, part of the Southern Uplands of Scotland. It is the next Donald after Green Lowther, the highest point of the ridge, when walking northeast and is usually ascended from this direction.

Images

References

Mountains and hills of South Lanarkshire
Donald mountains
Mountains and hills of the Southern Uplands